The 2013–14 Chattanooga Mocs basketball team represented the University of Tennessee at Chattanooga during the 2013–14 NCAA Division I men's basketball season. The Mocs, led by first year head coach Will Wade, played their home games at the McKenzie Arena and were members of the Southern Conference. They finished the season 18–15, 12–4 in SoCon play to finish in second place. They lost in the quarterfinals of the Southern Conference tournament to Georgia Southern. They were invited to the CollegeInsider.com Tournament where they lost in the first round to East Tennessee State.

Roster

Schedule

|-
!colspan=9 style="background:#00386B; color:#E0AA0F;"| Regular season

|-
!colspan=9 style="background:#00386B; color:#E0AA0F;"| SoCon tournament

|-
!colspan=9 style="background:#00386B; color:#E0AA0F;"| CIT

See also
 2013-14 Chattanooga Mocs women's basketball

References

Chattanooga Mocs men's basketball seasons
Chattanooga
Chattanooga
Chattanooga Mocs
Chattanooga Mocs